David Leon Nelson (born November 23, 1963) is a former American football player who played as a running back in the National Football League (NFL). Born in Miami, Florida, he attended North Miami Beach High School and Heidelberg University before entering the NFL with the Minnesota Vikings in 1984. He played two games for the Vikings, recording one rushing attempt for three yards and a kickoff return for zero yards.

References

1963 births
Living people
North Miami Senior High School alumni
Players of American football from Miami
American football running backs
Heidelberg Student Princes football players
Minnesota Vikings players